Svendborg railway station ( og Svendborg Station) is the principal railway station serving the town of Svendborg on the island of Funen, Denmark.

The station was built in 1876 for the opening of Svendborgbanen July 12, 1876. The main building is designed by N. P. C. Holsøe. The building was opened July 10, 1878.

The station building contains a DSB kiosk and a DSB travel agency. The kiosk has since been converted to a 7-Eleven store.  DSB tickets are available for purchase in the 7-Eleven store.  There also is a Fynbus customer service center that sells bus passes.  The station contains an indoor waiting area, however the travel agency no longer is in operation.

The Fynbus local city bus stop is located on the street side of the station, and the regional bus station is located on the opposite side of the tracks.

Decommissioned lines
 Svendborg–Nyborgbanen in commission from June 1, 1897, to May 30, 1964.
 Svendborg–Faaborgbanen in commission from November 25, 1916, to May 22, 1954.
 Cargo traffic by ferry to Ærøskøbing from 1934 to 1994

Buildings and structures in Svendborg Municipality
Railway stations in the Region of Southern Denmark
Railway stations opened in 1878
Transport infrastructure completed in 1916
Heinrich Wenck buildings
Svendborg
Railway stations in Denmark opened in the 19th century